Tarq is a village in Barrud Rural District, Kuhsorkh County, Razavi Khorasan Province, Iran. At the 2006 census, its population was 1,803, in 541 families.

Gallery

References 

Populated places in Kuhsorkh County